Mendur-Sokkon (Möndür-Sokkon) is a rural locality (a selo) in Ust-Kansky District, the Altai Republic, Russia. The population was 686 as of 2016. There are 9 streets.

Geography 
Mendur-Sokkon is located 21 km north of Ust-Kan (the district's administrative centre) by road. Kyrlyk is the nearest rural locality.

References 

Rural localities in Ust-Kansky District